Belfast South was a borough constituency of the Parliament of Northern Ireland from 1921 to 1929. It returned four MPs, using proportional representation by means of the single transferable vote.

Boundaries
Belfast South was created by the Government of Ireland Act 1920 and contained the Cromac, Ormeau and Windsor wards of the County Borough of Belfast. The House of Commons (Method of Voting and Redistribution of Seats) Act (Northern Ireland) 1929 divided the constituency into four constituencies elected under first past the post: Belfast Ballynafeigh, Belfast Cromac, Belfast Willowfield and Belfast Windsor.

Second Dáil
In May 1921, Dáil Éireann, the parliament of the self-declared Irish Republic run by Sinn Féin, passed a resolution declaring that elections to the House of Commons of Northern Ireland and the House of Commons of Southern Ireland would be used as the election for the Second Dáil. All those elected were on the roll of the Second Dáil, but as no Sinn Féin MP was elected for Belfast South, it was not represented there.

Politics
Belfast South was a strongly Unionist area, returning four Unionists in 1921 and 3 Unionists and 1 Independent Unionist MP in 1925.  Even following its abolition, Ballynafeigh, Cromac, and Windsor only ever elected Unionist MPs.

MPs

Election results

Woods declined the seat, having also been elected for Belfast West.

References

Northern Ireland Parliament constituencies established in 1921
Northern Ireland Parliament constituencies disestablished in 1929
Constituencies of the Northern Ireland Parliament
Constituencies of the Northern Ireland Parliament in Belfast
Dáil constituencies in Northern Ireland (historic)